Llewellyn "Llew" Treharne (birth unknown – death unknown) was a Welsh rugby union and professional rugby league footballer who played in the 1900s.

International honours
Llew Treharne won caps for Wales while at Wigan 1908 2-caps.

Club career
During Llewellyn Treharne's time at Wigan, they won the South West Lancashire League in 1904–05 and 1905–06.

References

External links
Statistics at wigan.rlfans.com

Penygraig RFC players
Place of birth missing
Place of death missing
Rugby league centres
Rugby league wingers
Wales national rugby league team players
Welsh rugby league players
Welsh rugby union players
Wigan Warriors players
Year of birth missing
Year of death missing